Collins Ngoran Fai (born 13 August 1992) is a Cameroonian professional footballer, who plays for Saudi Arabian club Al-Tai and the Cameroon national team. Mainly a right back, he can also operate as a left back.

Early life
Collins Fai was born and raised in Bamenda, a city of the English-speaking part of Cameroon. He spent his entire youth career at local FC Bamenda.

Club career
Aged 19, Fai joined the Cameroonian top team of Union Douala. 

In 2013, Collins Fai joined European football for the first time as he signed with the Romanian team of Dinamo București.

In January 2016, Fai joined Standard Liège in Belgium. On 17 March 2018, Fai played as Standard Liège beat Genk 1–0 in extra time to win the 2018 Belgian Cup Final and qualify for the UEFA Europa League. On 29 January 2022, Fai joined Saudi Arabian club Al-Tai.

Career statistics

Club

International

Honours
Union Douala
Cameroon Premiere Division: 2011–12

Standard Liège
Belgian Cup: 2015–16, 2017–18

Cameroon
Africa Cup of Nations: 2017: Winner

 Africa Cup of Nations 2022: Third place

References

External links
 
 

1992 births
Living people
People from Bamenda
People from Northwest Region (Cameroon)
Cameroonian footballers
Association football fullbacks
Cameroon international footballers
2017 Africa Cup of Nations players
2017 FIFA Confederations Cup players
2019 Africa Cup of Nations players
2021 Africa Cup of Nations players
2022 FIFA World Cup players
Africa Cup of Nations-winning players
Union Douala players
FC Dinamo București players
Standard Liège players
Al-Tai FC players
Liga I players
Belgian Pro League players
Saudi Professional League players
Cameroonian expatriate footballers
Cameroonian expatriate sportspeople in Romania
Expatriate footballers in Romania
Cameroonian expatriate sportspeople in Belgium
Expatriate footballers in Belgium
Cameroonian expatriate sportspeople in Saudi Arabia
Expatriate footballers in Saudi Arabia